Magneux is a commune in the Marne department in north-eastern France. Magneux-Courlandon station has rail connections to Reims and Fismes.

See also
Communes of the Marne department

References

Communes of Marne (department)